Arild Busterud (born 26 January 1948 in Løten) is a Norwegian track and field athlete known for the hammer throw.  He won two successive national championships in 1975 and 1976.  He continued throwing into masters age groups, setting the current world record in the M60 division.  While the Masters division throws lighter implements as competitors get older, his world record is less than half a meter less than his (nearly identical) national championship winning marks.

References

Living people
Norwegian male hammer throwers
1948 births
World record holders in masters athletics
People from Løten
Sportspeople from Innlandet